Villetta Barrea (Abruzzese:) is a comune and town in the province of L'Aquila, in the Abruzzo region of central Italy.

Its territory, located within the Monti Marsicani, is crossed by the Sangro river, which here receives its first affluents, the Scerto and Profluo.

References

Cities and towns in Abruzzo